Angela Rayner ( Bowen; born 28 March 1980) is a British politician serving as Shadow Chancellor of the Duchy of Lancaster, Shadow Minister for the Cabinet Office and Shadow Secretary of State for the Future of Work since 2021. She has been Shadow First Secretary of State, Deputy Leader of the Opposition and Deputy Leader of the Labour Party since 2020. Rayner has been Member of Parliament (MP) for Ashton-under-Lyne since 2015. She ideologically identifies as a socialist and as being part of Labour's soft left.

Rayner was born and raised in Stockport, where she attended the state secondary Avondale School. She left school aged 16 whilst pregnant and without any qualifications. She later trained in social care at Stockport College and worked for the local council as a care worker. She eventually became a trade union representative within Unison, during which time she joined the Labour Party. Selected to contest AshtonunderLyne in 2014 and elected for the seat at the 2015 general election, she was appointed as Shadow Minister for Pensions by Jeremy Corbyn in January 2016.

Rayner was promoted in July 2016 to the Shadow Cabinet as Shadow Secretary of State for Education and Shadow Minister for Women and Equalities. As Shadow Education Secretary, she proposed the creation of a National Education Service modelled on the National Health Service (NHS). She endorsed Rebecca Long-Bailey in the 2020 Labour Party leadership election, who came second to Keir Starmer, then successfully stood for the deputy leadership, after which she was appointed as party chair and national campaign coordinator. She was removed from these roles in a reshuffle following Labour's poor performance at the 2021 local elections, subsequently being appointed as Shadow Chancellor of the Duchy of Lancaster and Shadow Secretary of State for the Future of Work.

Early life and career
Rayner was born on 28 March 1980 in Stockport, Greater Manchester. She attended Avondale School in Stockport, leaving the school aged 16 after becoming pregnant, and did not obtain any qualifications. She later studied part-time at Stockport College, learning British Sign Language, and gaining an NVQ Level 2 in social care.

After leaving college, Rayner worked for Stockport Metropolitan Borough Council as a care worker for a number of years. During this time, she was also elected as a trade union representative for Unison. She was later elected as convenor of Unison North West, becoming the union's most senior official in the region. The Guardian featured a lengthy profile of Rayner in 2012, as part of an article on a trade union officer's working life.

Member of Parliament
In September 2014, Rayner was selected as the Labour Party's candidate for Ashton-under-Lyne, on the retirement of David Heyes. She won the seat at the 2015 general election, increasing the Labour majority and its share of the vote. She delivered her maiden speech on 2 June 2015.

Rayner nominated Andy Burnham in the 2015 Labour leadership election, but was one of just 18 MPs to back the incumbent Jeremy Corbyn against  Owen Smith in the 2016 leadership election.

On 1 July 2016, after a series of resignations from the shadow cabinet, Corbyn appointed Rayner as Shadow Secretary of State for Education. She supported the notion of a 'National Education Service' to be modelled along similar lines to the National Health Service (NHS), also promoting an increase in funding for early years education. She was considered by some as a possible future Labour leader.

In the 2019 general election, Rayner was returned as MP for the third time in five years. She did not stand for the Labour leadership in the 2020 leadership election, supporting her flatmate Rebecca Long-Bailey, who came second to Keir Starmer. She stood successfully for Deputy Leader, elected on 4 April 2020, replacing Tom Watson. She was appointed Deputy Leader of the Opposition, Shadow First Secretary of State and Chair of the Labour Party in the following days. In October 2020 Rayner called Conservative MP Chris Clarkson "scum" as he was giving a speech in Parliament. She later apologised. Clarkson had been critical of Andy Burnham, who had been seeking financial support for Greater Manchester following local restrictions on businesses being introduced. Clarkson's constituency falls within the boundaries of Greater Manchester, as does Rayner's.

Rayner was appointed to Her Majesty's Most Honourable Privy Council on 12 February 2021.

Rayner was removed from her roles as the Labour Party's chair and national campaign coordinator in a reshuffle by Starmer on 8 May 2021, following the 2021 local elections. Rayner was subsequently appointed as Shadow Chancellor of the Duchy of Lancaster and Shadow Secretary of State for the Future of Work.

In September 2021, Rayner strongly criticised senior members of the Conservative Party, stating: "We cannot get any worse than a bunch of scum, homophobic, racist, misogynistic, absolute pile... of banana republic... Etonian... piece of scum". Some Labour MPs, while saying it was not the language that they would have used, defended her comments, including Steve Reed, John McDonnell and Lisa Nandy. Starmer distanced himself from her remarks, but said it was up to Rayner if she wanted to apologise or not, while other Labour MPs, including shadow cabinet ministers, condemned her in stronger terms.

The former Labour cabinet minister Lord Adonis said that if Rayner did not apologise for her comments, Starmer should say that he no longer has confidence in her as the deputy leader of the party. Adonis told Times Radio that her remarks were a way to start an election campaign for the leadership of the Labour Party. Several Conservative MPs, including Grant Shapps, Amanda Milling and Oliver Dowden, condemned her comments. Rayner later apologised for her comments in light of the murder of David Amess, a Conservative MP, the following month.

In October 2021, Rayner reported receiving a number of death threats and abusive messages. The police arrested a 52-year-old man in Halifax. She cancelled a number of meetings with her constituents due to fears for her own safety. Later, a 36-year-old man from Cambridgeshire was sentenced after sending her a threatening email. The man pleaded guilty in court to sending the email and was sentenced to 15 weeks in prison, suspended for 18 months. Earlier in March 2019, Rayner said that she had fitted panic buttons at her home after rape and death threats were sent to her.

On 24 April 2022 Rayner was the subject of a report in The Mail on Sunday, by Glen Owen, in which it was alleged that she had tried to distract Boris Johnson in the Commons by crossing and uncrossing her legs in a similar manner to Sharon Stone in a scene from the 1992 film Basic Instinct. The report was subsequently condemned by a range of voices across the political spectrum including the Prime Minister and the Speaker of the House. The Independent Press Standards Organisation (IPSO) reported that it had received 5,500 complaints about the article and was exploring possible breaches of its code of practice. Lia Nici, the Parliamentary Under-Secretary of State for Levelling Up, Housing and Communities, later repeated the claims in a BBC interview.

In May 2022, Rayner said she would resign if she received a fixed penalty notice for breaching COVID-19 regulations while campaigning during the run-up to the Hartlepool by-election and local elections the previous year. The controversy surrounding the event was dubbed "Beergate". They were both cleared by Durham Police in July 2022 who said there was "no case to answer".

Political views

Rayner identifies as a socialist. In a 2017 interview to The Guardian discussing her political beliefs, Rayner highlighted her pragmatism, describing herself as being part of the "soft left" of the Labour Party. She has strongly criticised former Labour leader Jeremy Corbyn, as he "did not command the respect of the party", and critiqued his lack of "discipline" when it came to dealing with allegations of antisemitism.

Rayner has described herself as "quite hardline" on law and order issues, having suffered from antisocial behaviour when she was young. In an interview, she said police should "shoot your terrorists and ask questions second" and that she had told her local police force to "beat down the door of the criminals and sort them out and antagonise them."

Rayner has made a political point of her working-class roots. She has asked Hansard transcribers not to correct her speeches, preferring purportedly "incorrect" grammar "because it's who I am".

A member of the Labour Friends of Palestine and the Middle East, Rayner has condemned the killings of Palestinians during the Great March of Return and has repeatedly cited Israeli violations of human rights against Palestinians on social media.

Personal life
In 2010, Rayner married Mark Rayner, a Unison official. She has three sons, the first born when she was aged 16. Her second son Charlie was born prematurely at 23 weeks and Rayner says that the care that her son received demonstrated the importance of the NHS to her. Rayner lives in her constituency of Ashton-under-Lyne with her family. She became a grandmother in November 2017. Rayner and her husband separated in 2020. In the summer of 2022 journalists began reporting that Rayner was "in a relationship" with Labour MP Sam Tarry, which the pair have neither confirmed nor denied.

In an interview in 2018, Rayner said that her mother had been unable to read or write; she had previously mentioned this in a tribute she made to her mother in 2016. In a 2022 interview, Rayner said that she grew up in poverty on a council estate and could have been taken into care. In the same interview, she recounted that after a year-long training programme to lose over six stone in weight, she took out a bank loan of £5,600 for cosmetic surgery on her 30th birthday.

Notes

References

External links

Twitter

|-

|-

|-

|-

|-

|-

1980 births
Living people
21st-century British women politicians
Trade unionists from Greater Manchester
Trade unionists from Cheshire
Female members of the Parliament of the United Kingdom for English constituencies
Labour Party (UK) MPs for English constituencies
Members of the Parliament of the United Kingdom for Ashton-under-Lyne
People from Ashton-under-Lyne
People from Stockport
Members of the Privy Council of the United Kingdom
UK MPs 2015–2017
UK MPs 2017–2019
UK MPs 2019–present
Women trade unionists
British socialists
Women deputy opposition leaders
Deputy opposition leaders